The Torneo de Copa de Puerto Rico is the top knockout tournament of Puerto Rican football. In its inaugural year it was played entirely at Estadio Sixto Escobar over the course of one week, as a round-robin tournament with teams from three other nations invited.

Winners
2000 : Tampa Bay Mutiny            3–0 record in group play
2006 : Fraigcomar            2–1 Academia de Quintana

2000 results

References

Puerto Rico
Defunct football competitions in Puerto Rico